There are at least 319 mountain passes in the U. S. state of Oregon.

There are several words in use for a mountain pass in Oregon; the usage for each is:

See also
 Lists of Oregon-related topics

References

Oregon
Mountain passes
Mountain passes